Tibb's Eve refers to both a folk expression for a day which will never arrive, as well as a celebration held on 23 December originating in Newfoundland and Labrador known as Tipp's Eve.

Origin of the phrase 

Saint Tibb (or Tib) is a character appearing in 17th-century English plays. The character is a loose-moraled woman and was used for comic relief. The word was also used to describe a "wanton" as in Epigrammist Richard Turner's "Nosce Te (Humours)" written in 1607:

Folklorist Philip Hiscock notes: 

Tibb's Eve was a "non-time"; if something was said to happen on Tibb's Eve, it was unlikely it would ever happen. It appears circa 1785 in "A classical dictionary of the vulgar tongue" thusly: "Saint Tibb's Evening, the evening of the last day, or day of Judgement; he will pay you on St. Tibb's Eve, (Irish)." This usage, seen in English newspapers in the 1830s and American newspapers of the 1840s, is illustrated in this 1902 editorial:

Similar phrases exist, such as 30 February, "the twelfth of never", and "when two Mondays fall together"; however, Tibb's Eve has become associated with the Christmas season.

There are several records of this phrase in use in the Ulster dialect of Northern Ireland. In 1903 it was recorded with unknown origins and meaning "a day that would never come". In 1904, the phrase was included on a list of words in the Ulster dialect used in the Midland and Northwestern Counties as "a festival not to be found in the Calendar. Used as an evasion, as it is said to occur neither before nor after Christmas."

The expression "Saint Tibb's Eve" is recorded in Cornwall, also meaning "a day which never comes".

The phrase traveled to Newfoundland and Labrador. George Story describes Tibb's Eve as "generally 'neither before nor after Christmas', i.e. never" as an Anglo-Irish term in Newfoundland English dialect. Writing in a St. John's newspaper in 1921, then acting mayor JJ Mullaly used the phrase in this way, noting, "...you and the Mayor might be writing till Tibb's Eve without result." This use continued in the province at least into the 1970s:

As a holiday
Tibb's Eve, Tip's Eve, Tipp's Eve, or Tipsy Eve are regional variations used throughout Newfoundland and Labrador to describe the same celebration.

Sometime around World War II, people along the south coast of Newfoundland began to associate 23 December with the phrase 'Tibb's Eve' and deemed it the first night during Advent when it was appropriate to have a drink. Advent was a sober, religious time of year and traditionally people would not drink alcohol until Christmas Day at the earliest. Tibb's Eve emerged as an excuse to imbibe two days earlier.  

The tradition of celebrating Tibb's Eve may be similar to 19th century workers taking Saint Monday off from work.

Evolution and commercialization 

An outport tradition not originally celebrated in St. John's, Tibb's Eve was adopted circa 2010 by local bar owners, who saw it as a business opportunity. Brewery taproom owners have suggested that hosting Tibb's Eve events allow them to open up "Newfoundland experiences to outsiders."

The informal holiday has been also used for fundraising efforts, including the "Shine Your Light on Tibb’s Eve" fundraiser for the St. John's Women's Centre, first organized circa 2009 in St. John's, and Tibb's Eve charity drives organized by the Masons in Grand Bank, NL.

Since then, social media and expatriate Newfoundlanders have spread the tradition to other parts of Canada, such as Halifax, Nova Scotia and Toronto, Ontario. In 2014, Grande Prairie Golf and Country Club in Alberta hosted a Newfoundland-themed Tibb's Eve event, in support of local charities. In 2016, Folly Brewpub in Toronto brewed its own "Tibb's Eve" spiced ale. In 2019, comedian Colin Hollett described the holiday this way for a Halifax newspaper:
The concept of the day being the "official" start of the Christmas holiday season was promoted in local media by 2020. In 2021, several Newfoundland bars hosted Tibb's Eve ugly Christmas sweater events, while Port Rexton Brewery produced a "Tibbs the Saison" beer.

Pseudo-etymology 

Tibb's Eve is sometimes referred to as Tipp's Eve, Tip's Eve, or Tipsy Eve. A popular contemporary legend or folk etymology maintains that these names are attributed to the word tipple, which is a verb meaning to drink intoxicating liquor, especially habitually or to some excess. For example:

This use is reinforced with examples from the Dictionary of Newfoundland English. Christopher Perry of Daniel's Harbour, Newfoundland and Labrador says:

Edie Smith from Port-aux-Basques, Newfoundland and Labrador, explains where she believes the name comes from:

From the use of Tibb's Eve as meaning neither before nor after Christmas, and through folk etymology and pronunciation shift, the phrase became linked with the concept of tipsy or tipple. As William Kirwin says: 

Hiscock notes:

References

External links 

 1972 audio recording of a Tibb's Eve party at the house of Mrs. Bride Donohue, Boyd's Cove, Newfoundland, recorded by broadcaster Hiram Silk.

Culture of Newfoundland and Labrador
December observances
Christmas in Canada